Major Daniel Hopkin MC (July 1886 – 30 Aug 1951) was a British soldier, barrister and Labour Party politician.

Early life
Hopkin was born in Llantwit Major in South Wales, the son of a farm labourer who died in 1893 when Daniel was seven. After elementary school, he was a teacher in Llantwit Major School until 1905, when he left to study at Carmarthen Training College. He then won an exhibition to St Catharine's College, Cambridge, where he read law.

During the First World War, Hopkin served as an officer with the Royal Fusiliers. He was awarded the Military Cross in 1916 for conspicuous gallantry. After the war ended he spent "four years in business in Cairo" before training to become a barrister, where he served on the South Wales Circuit. He rejoined the army at the start of the Second World War in 1939.

Politics
He was elected at the 1929 general election as Member of Parliament (MP) for Carmarthen in South Wales, becoming the first Labour MP for the historically Liberal Party-held seat. He had narrowly failed to win the seat at a by-election in 1928, and his slender majority in 1929 was overturned by the Liberals the 1931 general election, as Labour's share of the vote nationally plummeted when the party split over Ramsay MacDonald's decision to form a National Government with the Conservative Party.

Hopkin regained the seat with a large majority at the 1935 general election, and held it until his resignation in 1941 to become a Metropolitan Police magistrate.

His son Sir David Hopkin (1922–1997) was also a Metropolitan Stipendiary Magistrate for over 20 years, rising to Chief Metropolitan Stipendiary Magistrate, but is probably best known as the Chairman and later President of the British Boxing Board of Control.

References

External links 

Welsh Labour Party MPs
UK MPs 1929–1931
UK MPs 1935–1945
Recipients of the Military Cross
People from the Vale of Glamorgan
1886 births
1951 deaths
Alumni of St Catharine's College, Cambridge
Royal Fusiliers officers
British Army personnel of World War I
Members of the Parliament of the United Kingdom for Carmarthenshire constituencies
Stipendiary magistrates (England and Wales)